The Benelux Office for Intellectual Property (BOIP) is the registration office for trademarks and designs in Belgium, the Netherlands, and Luxembourg. The BOIP is the legal successor of the Benelux Trademarks Office and the Benelux Designs Office (Dutch: Benelux-Bureau voor Tekeningen of Modellen, French: Bureau Benelux des Dessins ou Modèles). The BOIP is based at The Hague, Netherlands.

The BOIP is part of the Benelux Organisation for Intellectual Property, established by the Benelux Convention on Intellectual Property, which was signed on 25 February 2005 and entered into force on 1 September 2006. The Benelux Convention on Intellectual Property replaced the Benelux Convention on Trade Marks (1962) and the Benelux Convention on Designs (1966). It is not connected to the Benelux Union.

Other jurisdictions
Besides acting for the Benelux territory per se, BOIP also acts as the registration office for trade marks of the Caribbean Netherlands since the dissolution of the Netherlands Antilles on 10 October 2010. Until 10 October 2011 pre-existing Netherlands Antilles' trademarks had to be confirmed with the office in order to remain valid.

Since 1 January 2015, the BOIP also serves as the back office for the Bureau for Intellectual Property of Sint Maarten (BIP SXM), a task which had been performed by the trademark office of Curaçao since 10 October 2010.

See also 
 European Union Intellectual Property Office (EUIPO)

References

External links 
 
 

Benelux
Intellectual property organizations
Organisations based in The Hague
2005 establishments in Europe
Intergovernmental organizations established by treaty